Haviv (Hebrew: חָבִיב) is a Hebrew first name and last name meaning "darling" or "likeable". It is cognate to Arab Habib. Notable people with the name include:

Given name:
Haviv Rettig (born 1981), Israeli journalist (born Haviv Rettig Gur)
Haviv Shimoni (1933–1994), Israeli politician 

Surname:
Arie Haviv (born 1956), Israeli footballer
Avshalom Haviv (1926–1947), Irgun underground member
Ron Haviv (born 1965), American photojournalist
Sagi Haviv (born 1974), Israeli graphic designer

Jewish names
Jewish surnames
Hebrew-language given names
Hebrew-language surnames